Nihal Chandran is an Indian footballer who played as central defender for Mumbai FC in India's i-League.Retired a long time ago.

Career

Mumbai FC
Nihal has been playing for Mumbai FC since 2009.

Nihal chandran now owns his own fitness academy called 'VULKN FITNESS' which is a group fitness model and believes in sustainable fitness

References

External links
 Profile at Goal.com

Living people
Indian footballers
I-League players
Footballers from Mumbai
Association football defenders
Mumbai FC players
1990 births